Stephanie Louise Vallance, commonly known as Stevie Vallance, also credited as Louise Vallance during the 1970s90s, is a Canadian actress, musician, composer and director who has worked on numerous films and television series, both live-action and animated. Vallance is most recognized as Jenny in The Ropers, Det. Stevie Brody in Night Heat, and Whazzat Kangaroo in Zoobilee Zoo. As a director, she received a Daytime Emmy for voice-directing the music and dialogue on the children's animated series Madeline, in which she also portrayed "Miss Clavel" and "Genevive".

Early life and career 
Montréal-born, Toronto-raised Stephanie Louise Vallance began work as a professional actress at age eleven. At that time she was discovered by Alan Lund, who cast her in the lead role of "Adele" in the Charlottetown Festival musical production of Jane Eyre, which performed at Toronto's O'Keefe Centre (now the Sony Centre for the Performing Arts). As a teenager, Vallance made numerous television appearances including leading roles on Canadian television networks in King of Kensington; Police Surgeon; The Tommy Hunter Show; Norman Campbell's The Wonder of It All; and A Bird In The House, directed by Allan King.

Film and television 
After graduating from the American Academy of Dramatic Arts in New York, she moved to Los Angeles, where David Jacobs cast her as "Sylvie" in the first two seasons of Knots Landing (CBS) before ABC asked her to join the second season of The Ropers as "Jenny", the orphaned newspaper ‘boy’ whom Stanley and Helen found living in their attic; with Norman Fell, Audra Lindley, and Jeffrey Tambor.

As an LA-based actor, Vallance guest-starred on multiple network television series including Bosom Buddies, Lou Grant, and L.A. Law. She played Ernest's love interest, "Erma Terradiddle" in the Jim Varney feature film Slam Dunk Ernest. In Three Men and a Baby she was "Sally", opposite Steve Guttenberg.

In the 80s and 90s, Vallance commuted between Los Angeles and Toronto, starring in many Canadian/US co-productions including Poltergeist: The Legacy, The Outer Limits, F/X: The Series, Cobra, First Wave, Dracula: The Series, Forever Knight, and Road to Avonlea, where she was whisked away on a horse by Christopher Reeve. During that time she was best known for her role as series regular "Det. Stevie Brody" on the CBS late-night series Night Heat'; with Scott Hylands, Allan Royal, and Jeff Wincott. She followed that up with a very different sort of role of a pink marsupial named "Whazzat Kangaroo" on the Hallmark series Zoobilee Zoo, filmed entirely in California's San Fernando Valley.

Animation 
Vallance has lent her voice to hundreds of characters on animated television series: ReBoot as "Mouse" and "Rocky Raccoon"; Donkey Kong Country as "Dixie Kong"; Sonic Underground as the singing voice of "Sonia Hedgehog" and both singing and speaking voices of "Mindy LaTour"; Madeline as "Genevieve", "Miss Clavel" and numerous incidental roles; Gadget Boy as the nemesis "Spydra"; InuYasha as "Jinenji's Mother"; Totally Spies as the computer "G.L.A.D.I.S."; Growing Up Creepie as "Gnat"; Care Bears DIC original Series as "Proud Heart Cat"; and Care Bears: Journey to Joke-a-lot and The Care Bears' Big Wish Movie as "Share Bear"; Care Bears: Adventures in Care-a-Lot as "True Heart Bear"; Dennis the Menace as "Alice Mitchell"; Dinosaucers as "Princess Dei" and "Teryx; Lady Lovely Locks as "Duchess Ravenwaves" and "Maiden Curly Crown"; Popples as "Party Popple", "Puffball", "Prize" and "Punkity"; Bakugan Battle Brawlers, as "Tigrerra" and "Rabeeder"; Silverwing as "Breeze"; Nilus the Sandman as multiple incidental voices; and Cardcaptor Sakura: The Movie as "Yelan Li". Vallance voiced numerous characters on Don Bluth's animated features: Thumbelina and The Pebble and the Penguin; music director Barry Manilow.

Vallance (alongside Chalk, Tickner, St. Germain and many others) also dubbed voices on several British cartoons, two of those were Penny Crayon (additional voices), Becky and Barnaby Bear (as Barnaby) and Nellie the Elephant (as Nellie)

Voice direction 
Stevie has voice-directed more than 500 episodes of children's TV, working with children, actors, sports stars and celebrities. She was a recipient of a Daytime Emmy Award in 2002 for casting and voice-directing her first series, the dialogue and music-vocals on 70 episodes of the children's animated series Madeline for the Disney Channel, wherein she also portrayed the voices of "Miss Clavel" and "Genevieve". She then went on to voice-direct Silverwing for Bardel Animation Studios, and Totally Spies for Teletoon Network, on which she also voiced "G.L.A.D.I.S.".  In 2007, she was nominated for her third Emmy for casting and voice-producing the Discovery Kids and Mike Young Productions animated series, Growing Up Creepie. On the 9Story series Best Ed, Vallance served as Voice Director on 52 episodes. She then cast and voice-directed the Teletoon Detour pilot Celebutard Nation, which premiered at the 2009 Ottawa International Animation Festival. From 2011 to 2013, Stevie headed back to Los Angeles to cast and voice-direct two animation series for executive producer Bill Schultz: Guess How Much I Love You (Disney Junior); and Seasons 1 and 2 of Wild Grinders (Nicktoons), starring skateboard guru Rob Dyrdek. From 2014 to 2017, Stevie was based in Toronto as the Voice Director on Season 1-2 of Corus/Nelvana's action-adventure series The Mysticons.

Teaching 
Vallance teaches actors how to infuse personality into cartoon characters with her brand name Tooned In! Animation Voice-over Workshops. The first workshop took place in North Vancouver, British Columbia, in 1995. Since then Vallance has taught children and adults how to do cartoon voice-over in Chicago, New York, Ottawa, Orlando, Miami, Atlanta, Toronto, Phoenix, and Los Angeles. In 2009 and 2010, Stevie taught 400 Animators at the Ottawa International Animation Festival. In the fall of 2010, 400 Animation fans participated in her high-energy ‘one-person panel’ seminar at New York Comic Con.

Music 
In 1995, Vallance moved to Bowen Island, British Columbia where she met Michael Creber (piano; k.d. lang). Together in 1998, they recorded Vallance's debut jazz CD Practically Naked. In Vancouver, she sang jazz regularly at The Jazz Cellar and Rossini's, where she performed alongside some of the city's well-known jazz musicians at the time.

For her second CD, Always (A Salute to Patsy Cline), Vallance derived inspiration from her portrayal of Patsy Cline (with whom she shares a birthdate) in Dean Regan's staged production of A Closer Walk with Patsy Cline. Vallance toured western Canada with this production for six years, performing at numerous venues including two runs at the Granville Arts Club in Vancouver and the Alberta Theatre Projects in Calgary. Vallance opened for the Calgary Stampede as "Patsy", in 1999.

Motivated by the loss of a close personal friend, Vallance conceived the Divas for Life jazz benefit concerts held in Vancouver, B.C. In addition to producing the first concert at the Vogue Theater, in 2001, she negotiated a national distribution deal for the CD Divas for Life: Live At The Vogue!, which was released and performed as part of the 2001 Vancouver International Jazz Festival line-up. On Valentine's Day 2002, she produced Divas for Love. The proceeds of all concerts raised C$70,000 for people living with a life-threatening illness. As a result, Vallance was presented with Vancouver's "Friend in Deed" philanthropy award.

In 2004, Vallance debuted as a 'Jazz vocalist' in her hometown, Toronto, where she was accompanied by pianist Don Thompson, bassist Neil Swainson, and drummer Ted Warren. She also performed for the first time in her birth town Montréal, at The Upstairs, with jazz pianist Steve Amirault, bassist Zack Lober, and drummer Jim Doxas.

Vallance's fourth CD, Make My Night, was released in February 2008. Arranged by guitarist Pat Coleman, it features many other Canadian Jazz musicians: pianist Ross Taggart, trumpeter Mike Herriot, saxophonist Tom Colclough, drummer Buff Allen and bassist Miles Hill.

In 2009, Vallance performed in the Medicine Hat Jazz Festival for the second year in a row and was the featured vocalist alongside Ernie Duff and the Stardust Big Band, in and around Saugeen Shores, ON. She also sang with the Charlie Bell Trio in the Thornbury and Kincardine Jazz Festivals.

In 2010, Vallance organized a 10-concert series, Stevie Vallance & the Masters of Jazz, at the Bruce County Museum in Southampton, ON, presenting a line-up of world-class players who accompanied her as the vocalist for the series: Richard Whiteman (piano), Mike Grace (bass), Kevin Barrett (guitar), Kieran Overs (bass), Ted Warren (drums), Bobby Brough (sax), Rob Clutton (bass), Nancy Walker (piano), Ted Quinlan (guitar), Tim Posgate (guitar) and George Koller (bass).

References

External links 
 
 
 

Living people
Actresses from Montreal
American Academy of Dramatic Arts alumni
Anglophone Quebec people
Canadian casting directors
Women casting directors
Canadian women jazz singers
Canadian television actresses
Canadian voice actresses
Canadian voice directors
Singers from Montreal
Year of birth missing (living people)